Fineman may refer to:

 Herbert Fineman, (born 1920), politician
 Howard Fineman (born 1948), journalist
 Martha Fineman, scholar
 Uri Fineman (born 1959), singer

See also
 Feynman (disambiguation)
 Rondell Rawlins, nicknamed "Fineman"
 Smith–Fineman–Myers syndrome

Jewish surnames
Yiddish-language surnames